Daniela Álvarez Reyes (born October 23, 1993) is a Mexican beauty pageant titleholder who won the title of "Nuestra Belleza Mundo México" at the Nuestra Belleza México 2013 pageant. She is the second woman from Morelos to win the Nuestra Belleza Mundo title after Blanca Soto took it in 1997. She represented Mexico at the Miss World 2014 Beauty Pageant held on December 14, 2014, in London, United Kingdom where she was a semifinalist in the Top 10.

Telenovelas 
 Diseñando tu amor (2021) ... María José "Majo" Arriaga / Judith Arriaga
 La mexicana y el güero (2020-2021) ... Viiyéri Neiya Robles
 Por amar sin ley (2018-2019) ... Fernanda "Fer" Álvarez
 En tierras salvajes (2017) ... Regina Negrete
 Pasión y poder (2016) ... Yemilé

See also
 List of people from Morelos, Mexico

References

External links

1993 births
Living people
Nuestra Belleza México winners
People from Morelos
Miss World 2014 delegates